The 20th Senate district of Wisconsin is one of 33 districts in the Wisconsin State Senate.  Located in eastern Wisconsin, the district comprises northern Ozaukee County and most of Washington County, as well as parts of eastern Fond du Lac County, western Sheboygan County, and southern Calumet County.

Current elected officials
Duey Stroebel is the senator representing the 20th district.  He was first elected to the Senate in a 2015 special election and was subsequently elected to a full four-year term in the 2016 general election.  He previously served as a member of the Wisconsin State Assembly from 2011 to 2015.

Each Wisconsin State Senate district is composed of three State Assembly districts.  The 20th Senate district comprises the 58th, 59th, and 60th Assembly districts.  The current representatives of those districts are: 
 Assembly District 58: Rick Gundrum (R–Slinger)
 Assembly District 59: Ty Bodden (R–Stockbridge)
 Assembly District 60: Robert Brooks (R–Saukville)

The 20th Senate district, in its current borders, crosses three different congressional districts.  The portion of the district in Washington County falls within Wisconsin's 5th congressional district, which is represented by U.S. Representative Scott L. Fitzgerald; the portion of the district in Calumet County is in Wisconsin's 8th congressional district, represented by U.S. Representative Mike Gallagher; the remainder of the district—in Ozaukee, Fond du Lac, and Sheboygan counties—falls within Wisconsin's 6th congressional district, represented by U.S. Representative Glenn Grothman.

Past senators
The district has previously been represented by:

Note: the boundaries of districts have changed repeatedly over history. Previous politicians of a specific numbered district have represented a completely different geographic area, due to redistricting.

Notes

External links
Senate District 20 website
 

Wisconsin State Senate districts
Sheboygan County, Wisconsin
Ozaukee County, Wisconsin
Washington County, Wisconsin
Fond du Lac County, Wisconsin
Dodge County, Wisconsin
1852 establishments in Wisconsin